Elections in Virginia for the 2010 election cycle held on Tuesday, November 2, 2010. Primary elections were held on June 8.

City and town elections were held on May 4. Three special elections were also held:
June 15, 2010: House of Delegates 26th District
June 15, 2010: House of Delegates 27th District
July 13, 2010: City of Portsmouth

Federal

United States House

All 11 Virginia seats in the United States House of Representatives are up for election in 2010.

State

State House of Delegates

Two seats in the Virginia House of Delegates were up in special elections in 2010. Regular delegate elections are held every two years; the last election took place on November 3, 2009.

Judicial positions
One Virginia Supreme Court seat will be up for election in 2010, due to retirement. In Virginia, Supreme Court Justices can be chosen by the Governor, but they must be elected by the state legislature.
Virginia judicial elections, 2010 at Judgepedia

Ballot measures

At least three measures have been certified for the November 2, 2010 statewide election:
Question 1 - Exempt elderly from property taxes
Question 2 - Exempt veterans from property taxes
Question 3 - Increase the permissible size of the Revenue Stabilization Fund
Virginia 2010 ballot measures at Ballotpedia

Local
Many elections for county offices will also be held on November 2, 2010.

External links
Virginia State Board of Elections
Candidates for Virginia U.S. Congress at Project Vote Smart
Virginia Polls at Pollster.com

Virginia Congressional Races in 2010 campaign finance data from OpenSecrets
Virginia 2010 campaign finance data from Follow the Money

 
Virginia